Croatia is a predominantly Christian country, with Islam being a minority faith. It is followed by 1.3% of the country's population according to the 2021 census. Islam was first introduced to Croatia by the Ottoman Empire during the Croatian–Ottoman Wars that lasted from the 15th to 16th century. During this period some parts of the Croatian Kingdom were occupied which resulted in some Croats converting to Islam, some after being taken prisoners of war, some through the devşirme system. Nonetheless, Croats strongly fought against the Turks during these few centuries which resulted in the fact that the westernmost border of the Ottoman Empire in Europe became entrenched on the Croatian soil. In 1519, Croatia was called the Antemurale Christianitatis by Pope Leo X.

The Islamic Community of Croatia (Mešihat Islamske Zajednice u Hrvatskoj) is the main organization of Muslims in Croatia that is officially recognized by the state. The President of the Islamic Community is Aziz Effendi Hasanović. As of 2011, 62,977 Muslims live in Croatia.  Most of them  declare themselves as Bosniaks (31,479) while others declare themselves as: Albanians (9,594), Roma (5,039), Turks (343), Macedonians (217), Montenegrins (159), Ahmadies (16) and other (2,420).

The first modern mosque in Croatia was built in Gunja in 1969. Today there are 4 mosques and 2 Islamic centers in Croatia (in Zagreb and Rijeka). Historically, during the Ottoman rule, there was a significantly larger number of mosques in Croatia. At one point there were 250 of them, but as of 2014 only 3 structures remained standing. The largest and most representative one of them, Ibrahim Pasha's Mosque, is located in eastern Croatian town of Đakovo but is today used as the Roman Catholic Church of All Saints. Another mosque in eastern Croatia, which today does not exist, was located in Osijek. It was the Kasım Pasha Mosque constructed after 1526 at the site of modern-day Church of Saint Michael. Most of the Ottoman structures in the region were systematically destroyed after the Treaty of Karlowitz.

Highest rate of Muslims live in Gunja municipality (34,7 % population), followed by Cetingrad (20,62 %), Raša (17,88 %), Vojnić (15,58 %), Vodnjan (14,02 %), Labin (10,68 %), Kršan (7,96 %), Sveta Nedelja (7,47 %), Drenovci (7,27 %) and Čavle (6,72 %). As of 2011, there are totally 56 municipalities in Croatia in which no Muslims live, biggest of them being Bednja with 3,992 inhabitants.

History

Ottoman times 

The Turkish Ottoman Empire conquered part of Croatia from the 15th to the 19th century. Numerous Croats converted to Islam, some after being taken prisoners of war, some through the devşirme system. The westernmost border of Ottoman Empire in Europe became entrenched on Croatian soil. In 1519, Croatia was called the Antemurale Christianitatis by Pope Leo X.

The historical names of many officials in the Ottoman Empire reveal their origin (Hirvat = Hrvat or Horvat, which is a Croatian name for Croat): Rüstem Pasha (Rustem Pasha Hrvat - Opuković), Piyale Pasha (Pijali Pasha Hrvat), Memipaša Hrvat, Tahvilpaša Kulenović Hrvat etc.
There was some considerable confusion over the terms "Croat" and "Serb" in these times, and "Croat" in some of these cases could mean anyone from the wider South Slavic area.

In 1553, Antun Vrančić, Roman cardinal, and Franjo Zay, a diplomat, visited Istanbul as envoys of the Croatian-Hungarian king to discuss a peace treaty with the Ottoman Empire. During the initial ceremonial greetings they had with Rüstem Pasha Hrvat (a Croat) the conversation led in Turkish with an official interpreter was suddenly interrupted. Rustem Pasha Hrvat asked in Croatian if Zay and Vrančić spoke Croatian. The interpreter was then dismissed and they proceeded in Croatian during the entire process of negotiations.

In 1585, traveler and writer Marco A. Pigaffetta, in his Itinerario published in London, states: In Constantinople it is customary to speak Croatian, a language which is understood by almost all official Turks, especially military men. Crucially though, the lingua franca at the time among Slavic elites in the Ottoman Empire was still Old Church Slavonic.  For Italians traveling through to Istanbul, the language of the Slavic Croats was often the only exposure they had to any of the Slavic languages; indeed, Bulgarian and Macedonian dialects were far more common in Istanbul than Croatian.

Since the nineteenth century

Within the territory of the present Republic of Croatia, Muslim believers were registered for the first time during the 1931 census: 1,239 of them were in Zagreb and their overall number in Croatia being only about 4000.

During the Second World War the mufti of Zagreb was Ismet Muftić. After the war he was tried and eventually publicly hanged by the Partisans in 1945 because of his collaboration with the nazi regime of the Croatian WWII dictator Ante Pavelić.

In the following censuses in the People's Republic of Croatia, registered Muslim believers numbered as follows:
 1,077 persons in 1948
 16,185 persons in 1953
 3,113 persons in 1961
 18,487 persons in 1971
 23,740 persons in 1981
 43,486 persons in 1991

In the 1960s, the Bosnians Muslims community advocated for the recognition of the Bosniaks as a nationality in SFR Yugoslavia. The 1974 Yugoslav Constitution allowed for the official recognition of the Muslims as a nationality, therefore allowing more individuals to declare their alignment with a compromise categorization of ethnic Muslims (Muslimani), in this case separated from a religious basis (muslimani without capital letter). For example, Džemal Bijedić, a communist federal prime-minister was a declared "Muslim" and an atheist. The spike in the number of self-declared "Muslims" during socialist Yugoslavia times should thus be understood as persons having a family Muslim cultural background (similar to the concept of cultural Christians), rather than practicing believers in Islam.
Based on the figures recorded during the 1931 to 1961 census, it may also be concluded that a certain number of Muslim believers declared themselves as Croats or Yugoslavs.

After the dissolution of Yugoslavia, an additional increase can be attributed to the influx of Bosnian Muslims that took place during and after the 1992-1996 Bosnian conflict.

The 2001 Croatian census identified a total of 56,777 adherents of Islam, or 1.3% of the total population of Croatia.

Statistics

The published data from the 2011 Croatian census included a crosstab of ethnicity and religion which showed that a total of 62,977 Muslims (1.47% of the total population) was divided between the following ethnic groups:
 45,525 Bosniaks
 9.647 Croats 
 9,594 Albanians 
 6,704 ethnic Muslims
 5,039 Romani
 2,361 Muslims of other nationalities
 762 Muslims of undeclared nationality
 343 Turks
 217 Macedonians
 159 Montenegrins
 16 Ahmadiyya Muslims
 other individual ethnicities (under 100 people each)

By county 
Highest number of people following Islam live in Zagreb (18,044), however highest rate of Muslims is in Istria County, where 9,965 people (4,79 % of county's population) have faith in Islam. Lowest number of people following Islam is in Krapina-Zagorje County, where are only 200 Muslims, making 0,15 % of the county's population.

Islam today
Croatia's capital Zagreb has one of the biggest mosques in Europe since 1987. During the  existence of the Ottoman Empire it had none because Zagreb, as well as most parts of Croatia, was not occupied by the Ottomans during the Hundred Years' Croatian–Ottoman War.

The Bosniak imam Ševko Omerbašić, was the long-time leader of the Muslim community of Croatia and the Mufti of Zagreb.

A new mosque in Rijeka was opened in May 2013. The Muslim community is also planning to build a mosque in Osijek and Sisak.  A mosque in Karlovac is also being considered.

See also
 Bosniaks of Croatia
 Islamic Secondary School "Dr. Ahmed Smajlović"
 Ismet Muftić
 Demographics of Croatia
 Muslims (ethnic group)
 Turkish Croatia
Ahmadiyya in Croatia

References

External links

 Hr/darko/etf/et02/html
 Islamska-zajednica.hr
 Zg-medresa.hr
 Croatia’s Muslims Spared Europe’s Growing Islamophobia, Balkan Insight, 12 October 2018

 
Bosniaks of Croatia
Albanians of Croatia
Middle Eastern diaspora in Croatia
Romani in Croatia